Brunei, officially known as Brunei Darussalam, competed at the 2020 Summer Olympics in Tokyo. Originally scheduled to take place from 24 July to 9 August 2020, the Games were postponed to 23 July to 8 August 2021, due to the COVID-19 pandemic. This was the nation's eighth appearance at the Summer Olympics since its debut at the 1988 Summer Olympics. Brunei failed to register any athletes in two editions of the Games: 1992 in Barcelona and 2008 in Beijing.

Competitors
The following is the list of number of competitors in the Games.

Athletics

Brunei received a universality slot from the World Athletics to send a male track and field athlete to the Olympics.

Track & road events

Swimming

Brunei received a universality invitation from FINA to send a top-ranked male swimmer in his respective individual events to the Olympics, based on the FINA Points System of June 28, 2021.

References

Nations at the 2020 Summer Olympics
2020

Olympics